Ryan Hall (born February 22, 1985) is an American black belt and instructor in Brazilian jiu-jitsu, and a professional mixed martial artist currently competing in the featherweight division of the Ultimate Fighting Championship (UFC). He is known for a number of competitive achievements, ranging from Mundial and ADCC victories to dozens of Grapplers Quest championships. He is the winner of The Ultimate Fighter Season 22.

Background 
Ryan Hall was born on 22 February 1985 in Arlington, Virginia.
Hall attended Manhattan College in The Bronx, NY and studied Electrical Engineering.

Mixed martial arts career

Early career 
In 2012, Hall began training in mixed martial arts at Tristar Gym in Montreal, Canada. He represented his new team for the first time in the cage at SLAMM-1 on November 30, 2012, in Montreal, Canada where he won by TKO in the first round.

Hall fought on the Challenge MMA 2 card on August 17, 2013. He submitted Maged Hammo at the Montreal, Quebec event.

Hall defeated Leo Perez via TKO at Fight Lab 35 in Charlotte, NC on February 8, 2014, and submitted Ryan Hogans via first round heel hook at the United Combat League on May 31 in Hammond, IN.

The Ultimate Fighter 
On August 31, 2015, it was announced that Hall would be a contestant on the 22nd season of The Ultimate Fighter reality show, representing Team USA.

In the opening elimination bout, Hall faced fellow American Johnny Nunez. He won the fight via heel hook early in the first round.

Hall represented Team USA in the first preliminary fight of the season facing Sweden's Frantz Slioa. He once again won the fight via heel hook in the first round. He advanced to the quarter finals, where he lost to Saul Rogers by majority decision. Rogers advanced to the final, but a visa issue prevented him from fighting, instead allowing Hall to fight Artem Lobov in The Ultimate Fighter 22 Finale. Hall defeated Lobov by unanimous decision to become the Ultimate Fighter 22 lightweight winner.

Ultimate Fighting Championship 

Hall was expected to face Alex White on July 13, 2016, at UFC Fight Night 91. However, the bout was scrapped on June 28 as White pulled out due to an undisclosed injury. In turn, Hall elected to fight on a different date rather than have the promotion find him a replacement.

Hall next faced Gray Maynard on December 3, 2016, at The Ultimate Fighter 24 Finale. He won the fight via unanimous decision.

Hall faced B.J. Penn on December 29, 2018, at UFC 232. He won the fight via a heel hook submission in the first round. This win earned him the Performance of the Night award.

Hall faced Darren Elkins on July 13, 2019, at UFC on ESPN+ 13. He won the fight via unanimous decision.

Despite being a ranked fighter, Hall has made headlines due to his inability to find a fight, going long stretches between matches (with only four fights in over four years since signing with the UFC). He has been vocal about fighting anyone so long as he has been given preparation, but his management and the UFC has had difficulties finding him similarly or higher ranked opponents. Two weeks later, the UFC official found an opponent for Hall.

Hall was scheduled to face Ricardo Lamas on May 2, 2020, at UFC Fight Night: Hermansson vs. Weidman. However, on April 9, Dana White, the president of UFC announced that this event was postponed to a future date The bout was rescheduled on August 29, 2020, at UFC Fight Night 175.  However, Hall was pulled from the event due to an undisclosed injury.

Hall was scheduled to face Dan Ige on March 13, 2021, at UFC Fight Night 187. However, Hall pulled out of the fight on February 11 due to a hip flexor injury.

Hall faced Ilia Topuria on July 10, 2021, at UFC 264. He lost the fight via knockout in round one.

Hall faced Darrick Minner on December 11, 2021, at UFC 269. He won the bout via unanimous decision.

Personal life 
Hall and his wife have a son (born 2018). While a contestant on The Ultimate Fighter, Hall explained that his frequent facial tics are a result of a mild form of Tourette's syndrome.

Self-defense incident 
In 2011, a viral video of Hall surfaced showing Hall using grappling techniques to defend himself against a larger, aggressive man while dining in a pizza parlor. In the video, Hall demonstrates the use of a single leg takedown and the mount position. Later, he applies a chokehold to the man shortly before police arrive.

Grappling career 
Hall has earned a number of accolades in professional Jiu-Jitsu competition, the highlight of his career coming in 2009 when he earned a bronze medal at the ADCC world championships. In 2007, Hall fought fellow future-UFC competitor Nate Diaz in the final of the US Open at purple belt, losing by submission and taking second place.

ADCC head organizer Mo Jassim originally stated he was looking at booking Hall to return to professional grappling at the 2022 ADCC world championship. In March, 2022, Hall was given an official invite to compete in the 66kg division at the event. He withdrew from the event in June, 2022 after suffering a complete tear to his ACL.

Hall is scheduled to challenge Ashley Williams for the Polaris lightweight title in the main event of Polaris 24 on June 3, 2023.

Championships and accomplishments

Brazilian jiu-jitsu 
Main Achievements:
 2 x IBJJF Jiu-Jitsu World Champion (2007 / 2008 purple)
 IBJJF Jiu-Jitsu European Open Champion (2008 purple)
 IBJJF Chicago Jiu-Jitsu Open champion (2009 Absolute black belt)
 3rd Place Brazilian National Jiu-Jitsu Championship (2008 purple)
 3rd Place IBJJF Jiu-Jitsu World Championship (2009 brown)

Grappling 
Main Achievements:
 ADCC US West Coast Trials winner (2009)
 3rd Place ADCC Submission Fighting World Championship (2009)

Mixed martial arts 
Ultimate Fighting Championship
The Ultimate Fighter 22 Lightweight Winner
Performance of the Night (One time) .
MMA Fighting
2018 Submission of the Year vs. B.J. Penn
CombatPress.com
2018 Submission of the Year vs. B.J. Penn

Mixed martial arts record 

|-
|Win
|align=center|9–2
|Darrick Minner
|Decision (unanimous)
|UFC 269
|
|align=center|3
|align=center|5:00
|Las Vegas, Nevada, United States
|
|-
|Loss
|align=center|8–2
|Ilia Topuria
|KO (punches)
|UFC 264
|
|align=center|1
|align=center|4:47
|Las Vegas, Nevada, United States
|
|-
|Win
|align=center|8–1
|Darren Elkins
|Decision (unanimous)
|UFC Fight Night: de Randamie vs. Ladd
|
|align=center|3
|align=center|5:00
|Sacramento, California, United States
|
|-
|Win
|align=center|7–1
|B.J. Penn
|Submission (heel hook)
|UFC 232
|
|align=center|1
|align=center|2:46
|Inglewood, California, United States
|
|-
|Win
|align=center|6–1
|Gray Maynard
|Decision (unanimous)
|The Ultimate Fighter: Tournament of Champions Finale
|
|align=center|3
|align=center|5:00
|Las Vegas, Nevada, United States
|
|-
|Win
|align=center|5–1
|Artem Lobov
|Decision (unanimous)
|The Ultimate Fighter: Team McGregor vs. Team Faber Finale
|
|align=center|3
|align=center|5:00
|Las Vegas, Nevada, United States
|
|-
| Win
| align=center| 4–1
| Ryan Hogans
| Submission (heel hook)
| UCL: Torres vs. Choate
| 
| align=center| 1
| align=center| 1:53
| Hammond, Indiana, United States
|
|-
| Win
| align=center| 3–1
| Leonardo Perez
| TKO (punches)
| Fight Lab 35: Misery Loves Company 6
| 
| align=center| 3
| align=center| 1:44
| Charlotte, North Carolina, United States
|
|-
| Win
| align=center| 2–1
| Maged Hammo
| Submission (rear-naked choke)
| Challenge MMA 2: Think Big
| 
| align=center| 1
| align=center| 2:43
| Montreal, Quebec, Canada
|
|-
| Win
| align=center| 1–1
| Phillip Deschambeault
| TKO (punches)
| Slamm 1: Garcia vs. Lamarche
| 
| align=center| 1
| align=center| 1:41
| Montreal, Quebec, Canada
|
|-
| Loss
| align=center| 0–1
| Eddie Fyvie
| Decision (unanimous)
| Reality Fighting 12: Return to Boardwalk Hall
| 
| align=center| 3
| align=center| 3:00
| Atlantic City, New Jersey, United States
|

|-
| Loss
| align=center| 2–1
| Saul Rogers
| Decision (majority)
| rowspan=3|The Ultimate Fighter: Team McGregor vs. Team Faber
| (airdate)
| align=center| 2
| align=center| 5:00
|rowspan=3|Las Vegas, Nevada, United States
|
|-
|Win
|align=center|2–0
| Frantz Slioa
| Submission (heel hook)
| (airdate)
|align=center|1
|align=center|1:52
|
|-
|Win
|align=center|1–0
| Johnny Nunez
| Submission (heel hook)
| (airdate)
|align=center|1
|align=center|0:43
|

References

External links 
 

1985 births
Living people
American male mixed martial artists
Mixed martial artists utilizing Brazilian jiu-jitsu
American practitioners of Brazilian jiu-jitsu
People awarded a black belt in Brazilian jiu-jitsu
Manhattan College alumni
Mixed martial artists from Virginia
Ultimate Fighting Championship male fighters